A hinge line is an imaginary longitudinal line along the dorsal edge of the shell of a bivalve mollusk where the two valves hinge or articulate. The hinge line can easily be perceived in these images of a mussel shell and an ark shell.

The hinge teeth, structures which control the articulation of the valves, are often but not always situated along the hinge line.

References

Mollusc shells